Aechmea cylindrata is a bromeliad, native to southeastern Brazil from São Paulo to Santa Catarina. This plant is cited in Flora Brasiliensis by Carl Friedrich Philipp von Martius, and it is often used as an ornamental plant.

References

External links
 Flora Brasiliensis:  Aechmea cylindrata

cylindrata
Flora of Brazil
Plants described in 1891